Marat Lenzovich Mulashev (born 7 January 1968) is a Russian professional football coach and a former player.

Honours
 Russian Second Division Zone East top scorer: 1996 (22 goals).

External links
 
 

1968 births
Sportspeople from Omsk
Living people
Soviet footballers
Russian footballers
Association football forwards
Russian Premier League players
Ukrainian Premier League players
Russian expatriate footballers
Expatriate footballers in Ukraine
Russian expatriate sportspeople in Ukraine
Russian football managers
SC Tavriya Simferopol players
FC Rubin Kazan players
FC Luch Vladivostok players
FC Chernomorets Novorossiysk players
FC Irtysh Omsk players